is a drama written by Masataka Matsuda. Later, a movie version, directed by Kazuo Kuroki and starring Tomoyo Harada and Masatoshi Nagase, was released in Japan on August 12, 2006. Kuroki died several months before it was released.

Plot 
In Kagoshima, in the final days of World War II, an offer of marriage comes to Etsuko Kamiya, who lives with her brother and his wife. The offer comes from Nagayo, but Etsuko is attracted to his friend, Akashi.

Cast 
 Tomoyo Harada - Etsuko Kamiya 
 Masatoshi Nagase - Ensign Nagayo 
 Shunsuke Matsuoka - Ensign Akashi 
 Manami Honjo - Fusa Kamiya 
 Kaoru Kobayashi - Yasutada Kamiya

Awards 
 31st Hochi Movie Award - Special Prize
 61st Mainichi Film Award - Cinematographic Award (Koichi Kawakami)
 21st Takasaki Film Festival - Best Actress in a Supporting Role (Manami Honjo)
 Kinema Junpo Japanese Movie Best 10 in 2006 - 4th Place
 Japanese Film Pen Club in 2006 - 2nd Place in Japanese films

References

External links 

Japanese plays
2006 films
Films directed by Kazuo Kuroki
Japanese war films
Japanese films based on plays
Japanese World War II films
2000s Japanese films